Old Navy is an American clothing and accessories retailing company owned by multinational corporation Gap Inc. It has corporate operations in the Mission Bay neighborhood of San Francisco, California. The largest of the Old Navy stores are its flagship stores, located in New York City, Seattle, Chicago, San Francisco, Manila, and Mexico City.

History

In the early 1990s, Dayton-Hudson Corporation (then the parent company of Target, Mervyn's, Dayton's, Hudson's, and Marshall Field's) looked to establish a new division branded as a less expensive version of Gap called Everyday Hero; Gap's then-CEO Millard Drexler responded by opening Gap Warehouse in existing Gap outlet locations in 1993.

On March 11, 1994, Gap Warehouse was renamed Old Navy Clothing Co. in order to establish a separate image from its parent company Gap Inc. The name was conceived after the original proposed names, Monorail and Forklift, were disliked by Drexler, and decided upon the new name after seeing a building with the two words on it during a visit to Paris. On March 11, 1994, the first Old Navy locations opened in the northern California towns of Colma, San Leandro and Pittsburg. According to Kevin Lonergan, Gap's director of stores, Old Navy stores were intentionally designed like grocery stores, with flowing aisles, shopping carts, and small impulse items near the checkout counters. The cement floor, metal shelving, and checkout counters built from polished pressed board and galvanized metal gave the stores an industrial warehouse feel, while the colorful arrangements and large number of employees working set it apart from other discount clothing stores. Later that year, 42 other Old Navy stores opened, and most of the 45 Gap Warehouse stores were renamed Old Navy.

Old Navy had campy television ads featuring Carrie Donovan, Morgan Fairchild, and the mascot Magic, the dog.

The Old Navy division grew quickly; in 1997, it became the first retailer to pass $1 billion in its first four years in business, and opened 500 stores by 2000. In 2001, Old Navy began its international expansion with the opening of 12 stores in Ontario, Canada.

The brand also experimented, opening a coffee shop inside one location in San Francisco in December 1995, and opening an Old Navy Kids location in Littleton, Colorado, in April 1997. This in turn did not work out for the company, and was terminated the following September.

 
In 2005, Old Navy's then-president Dawn Robertson looked to address the competition she saw in Hollister Co. and American Eagle Outfitters by rebranding the division with a "high fashion feel". In addition to a new logo, several locations were built or remodeled to reflect the "New Old Navy"; one such location in St. Petersburg, Florida cost roughly $5 million to develop. Unlike the traditional industrial warehouse style most Old Navy locations possess, the new stores were boutique in nature, featuring green building materials, rock gardens, large murals, and posters, as well as many mirrored and silver accents. Also, advertisements began to be created in-house, and substituted the original kitschy and humorous feel for a high fashion and feminine directive. These stores proved to be a disappointing investment and Robertson was asked to leave the company.

In 2011, Old Navy began a second rebranding to emphasize a family-oriented environment, known as Project ONE. It targets Old Navy's target customer (the fictional "Jenny", a married mother of at least one child) and features better lighting, vibrant colors, layouts that make shopping easier, quick-change stations, and a more efficient cash wrap design. By July 12, 2011, one third of the company's North American locations had adopted the redesign.

In 2012, after several years of Old Navy losing sales to rival retailer H&M, Gap Inc. hired H&M executive Stefan Larsson to run its Old Navy division. Larsson instituted a number of changes, including hiring designers away from Coach, Nike, Reebok, and North Face to design exclusive Old Navy clothing. By 2015, Old Navy's yearly sales had reached $6 billion per year in the United States, almost equaling those of Gap Inc.'s Gap and Banana Republic divisions combined. Larsson left the company to join Ralph Lauren in 2015 and was replaced by current President and CEO, Sonia Syngal.

On October 26, 2017, Old Navy opened two new flagship stores (one in Times Square). The Times Square flagship caters to New York City crowds with extended store hours and significantly more retail space than the average Old Navy location.

On April 23, 2018, a customer, Saudia Scott filed a multi-million dollar lawsuit against Old Navy and its parent company Gap Inc. The lawsuit states that on July 25, 2016, Old Navy manager Megan Yost watched and assisted Scott with her purchases at the Old Navy store located in Abingdon, Harford County, Maryland.  As Scott walked to her car, two police officers followed, detained and returned Scott to inside the store after Yost falsely accused Ms. Scott of theft and shoplifting. Manager Yost was terminated almost immediately as a result.    A jury trial is scheduled for June, 2023.

In 2019, Gap Inc. announced that Old Navy will exit China in 2020.

On February 28, 2019, Gap Inc., announced that Old Navy and Gap Inc. would split into two companies, making Old Navy an independent company from Gap Inc. The move was designed to enable the consolidation of the company's older brands, like GAP and Banana, with its newer Athleta and Hill City. This decision was reversed on January 16, 2020, when Gap Inc. announced that the separation had been aborted.

Awards
 In 2013, Gap Inc. ranked 5th among specialty retailers in the list of World's Most Admired. 
 Members of Business for Innovative Climate and Energy Policy (BICEP)
Named to FORTUNE's Great Place to Work list in 2016, 2017 and 2018

References

External links

 
 Gap Inc.—parent company website
 Flagship Store Virtual Tour

Gap brands
Clothing brands of the United States
Fashion accessory brands
Underwear brands
Retail companies based in California
Companies based in San Francisco
American companies established in 1994
Clothing companies established in 1994
Retail companies established in 1994
1994 establishments in California
1990s fashion
2000s fashion